The list of Wharton School faculty includes notable faculty members, professors, and administrators affiliated with the Wharton School at the University of Pennsylvania, located in Philadelphia, Pennsylvania.

Current faculty

Administration 

 Erika H. James - Academic administrator and current dean
Serguei Netessine - Professor of Innovation and Entrepreneurship, of Operations, Information and Decisions and Vice Dean for Global Initiatives
Jagmohan S. Raju - Professor of Marketing and Vice Dean, Wharton Executive Education

Current faculty 

Andrew B. Abel - Professor of the Department of Finance
J. Scott Armstrong -  Author, forecasting and marketing expert and Professor of Marketing
Janice R. Bellace - Professor Emeritus of Legal Studies & Business Ethics
Jonah Berger - Associate Professor of Marketing
Eric T. Bradlow - Professor of Marketing, Statistics, Education and Economics
Lawton R. Burns - Business theorist, Professor of Management and Chairman of the Health Care Management Department
T. Tony Cai - Professor of Statistics
George S. Day -  Educator and consultant in the fields of marketing, strategy and innovation management. Professor Emeritus and founder of the Mack Institute for Innovation Management at the Wharton School
Neil A. Doherty - Economist and Frederick H. Ecker Professor Emeritus of Insurance and Risk Management
Thomas Donaldson - Professor of Ethics and Law
Peter S. Fader - Professor of Marketing
Jill Fisch - Professor at the University of Pennsylvania Law School
Stewart D. Friedman - Professor emeritus and founding director of the Wharton Leadership Program
Adam Grant - Professor of Psychology
Herbert Hovenkamp - Professor of Law and Professor of Legal Studies & Business Ethics
Donald B. Keim - Professor of Finance
Risa Lavizzo-Mourey - Professor of Health Care Management
Olivia S. Mitchell - Professor of Business Economics and Public Policy, of Insurance and Risk Management and Executive Director, Pension Research Council
Mark V. Pauly - Professor of Health Care Management and of Business Economics and Public Policy
Thomas S. Robertson - Professor of Marketing and Academic Director, Jay H. Baker Retailing Center
Paul R. Rosenbaum - Professor of Statistics
Maurice E. Schweitzer - Professor of Operations and Information Management
Kenneth L. Shropshire - Professor Emeritus, former David W. Hauck Professor and Faculty Director of the Wharton Sports Business Initiative
Jeremy J. Siegel - Professor of Finance
Nicolaj Siggelkow - Professor of Management
Kent Smetters - Professor of Business Economics and Public Policy
Robert F. Stambaugh - Professor of Finance

Former faculty 

 Robert J. Shiller (born 1946), Nobel-Prize winning economist, academic, and author

Administration 

Thomas P. Gerrity - Former dean and Professor of Management

References

External links 

 Wharton Website

Wharton School of the University of Pennsylvania people